NGC 6822-WR 12 is a WN-type Wolf-Rayet star located in the galaxy NGC 6822, about 1.54 million light years away in the constellation of Sagittarius. NGC 6822-WR 12 was the first Wolf-Rayet star to be discovered in the galaxy, and is one of only four known in the galaxy.

Discovery 
In 1983, a Wolf-Rayet (WR) star was identified in the barred irregular galaxy NGC 6822.  The appearance of strong ionised helium emission lines in its spectrum, together with ionised nitrogen emission lines but no carbon lines, led to the assignment of the spectral class WN3.  At the time, it was the only known WR star in NGC 6822.

NGC 6822-WR 12 was the 12th candidate of 12 candidate WR stars found in NGC 6822 during a survey of NGC 6822 and IC 1613. In a follow-up study, only 4 of the WR candidates in NGC 6822 were confirmed as WR stars, and they are still the only WR stars known in NGC 6822.

Properties 
Assuming mass-luminosity relations for Wolf-Rayet stars points to a very high mass, about 36 solar masses.

Composition 
As is typical of WN stars, NGC 6822-WR 12 has almost no hydrogen, it having been either fused to helium or lost through strong stellar winds. However, due to the very low metallicity of NGC 6822, similar to that of the Small Magellanic Cloud, it has a lower nitrogen abundance than that of galactic WN stars, containing just 0.3% nitrogen. The emission lines of ionised nitrogen in the spectrum are correspondingly weak.  The rest of the star is helium and its spectrum is dominated by emission lines of ionised helium.

References 

Wolf–Rayet stars
Sagittarius (constellation)
Extragalactic stars
NGC 6822